Andrew Joseph McBeth (born 30 August 1943) was a Scottish footballer who played for Dumbarton, Stirling Albion and Morton.

References

1943 births
Scottish footballers
Dumbarton F.C. players
Stirling Albion F.C. players
Greenock Morton F.C. players
Scottish Football League players
Living people
Association football wingers